The Telecommunications Act is an Act of the Parliament of Canada that regulates telecommunications by ensuring reliable services, protecting privacy, and to protect and encourage the Canadian media. The Act is administered by the Canadian Radio-television and Telecommunications Commission (CRTC) which reports to Industry Canada. It replaced the Railway Act of 1906, which governed telecommunication prior to 1993, making it the first full legislative scheme addressing telecommunications.

Among its stipulations are prescient regulations that, in spirit follow the general principles of net neutrality decades before the telecommunications concept arose as a matter of public debate with the rise of the internet as a common telecommunications system. For instance, internet providers are considered utilities under this law in that they can't give "undue or unreasonable preference," nor can they influence the content being transmitted over their networks.

In November 2005, an amendment was passed to allow for the creation of a national Do-not-call list under section 41.

See also
 Radiocommunication Act

References

External links
 Text of the Act (Department of Justice | CanLII)

Canadian federal legislation
Telecommunications law
1993 in Canadian law
Telecommunications in Canada